The 1876 Maine gubernatorial election was held on September 11, 1876. Incumbent Republican Governor Seldon Connor defeated Democratic nominee John C. Talbot.

General election

Candidates

Republican 

 Seldon Connor

Democratic 

 John C. Talbot

Results

References 

Maine gubernatorial elections
Maine
Gubernatorial